Topp Stemning På Lokal Bar is an album  by the Norwegian synthpop band Casiokids, released in the US on June 8, 2010, in physical and digital formats. The deluxe version includes bonus remixed material, on a second CD in the physical version. The song "Fot i Hose" in this album is part of the soundtrack of the EA Sports videogame, FIFA 10.

Track listing

References

Casiokids albums
2010 albums